Maria da Graça Carvalho (born April 9, 1955) is a Portuguese academic, engineer and politician who has served as a Member of the European Parliament from 2009 until 2014 and again since the 2019 elections.

Career

Early career
Earlier in her career, Carvalho worked as a professor at the University of Lisbon.

Career in national politics
From 2003 to 2005, Carvalho was a member of Portugal's government, first as Minister of Science and Higher Education and later as the Minister of Science, Innovation and Higher Education in the cabinets of successive prime ministers José Manuel Barroso (2003–2004) and Pedro Santana Lopes (2004–2005).

Career in European politics
Carvalho acted as adviser to Barroso in his capacity as President of the European Commission from 2006 to 2009.

Carvalho first served as a Member of the European Parliament from 2009 to 2014 as a representative of Portugal's Social Democratic Party (PSD). She was a member of the Parliament's Committee on Industry, Research and Energy (ITRE). In this capacity, she was also the Parliament's rapporteur on the Horizon 2020 research framework programme (2014–2020). In addition to her committee assignments, she was a member of the Parliament's delegation to the ACP–EU Joint Parliamentary Assembly.

From 2014 until 2015, Carvalho served as an adviser to European Commissioner for Research, Innovation and Science Carlos Moedas. She later moved as a staff member to the Commission's Directorate-General for Research and Innovation.

Carvalho again joined the European Parliament in the 2019 elections. She has been serving on the Committee on Industry, Research and Energy (since 2020), Committee on Fisheries (since 2021) and the Special Committee on Artificial Intelligence in a Digital Age (since 2021).

In addition to her committee assignments, Carvalho is a member of the delegation for relations with the United States. She is also a member of the European Parliament Intergroup on Climate Change, Biodiversity and Sustainable Development, the European Internet Forum and the MEPs Against Cancer group.

Other activities
 Instituto Francisco Sá Carneiro, Chair of the Board of Directors (since 2020)
 Re-Imagine Europa, Member of the Task Force on Sustainable Agriculture and Innovation (since 2020)
 International Centre for Sustainable Development of Energy, Water and Environment Systems, Member of the International Scientific Committee

Recognition
Carvalho is the recipient of the following awards:
 2016 – Prize Maria de Lourdes Pintasilgo, a career prize to honour outstanding women scientists and engineers
 2016 – IUMRS International Union of Materials Research Societies Global Leadership and Service Award
 2012 – Medal of Merit of the City of Beja
 2011 – Prize for the best Member of the European Parliament in the area of Research and Innovation
 2008 – CIRCE Prize, CIRCE Foundation, Saragossa
 2005 – Portuguese Great Cross-Chancellery of the International Order of Merit of the Discoverer of Brazil
 2002 – “Great Official of the Order of Public Instruction” by the President of Portugal

References 

1955 births
Academic staff of the University of Lisbon
Living people
MEPs for Portugal 2009–2014
MEPs for Portugal 2019–2024